River of Blue Fire is a science fiction novel by American writer Tad Williams, the second book in his Otherland series.  It was originally published in 1998, the paperback in 1999.

It continues the saga begun in City of Golden Shadow and takes the characters through among others a weird Wizard of Oz simulation, a Neanderthal world and a cartoon world.

References

1998 American novels
1998 science fiction novels
American science fiction novels
Novels by Tad Williams
DAW Books books
Fiction about neanderthals
Books with cover art by Michael Whelan